USS Fergus (APA-82) was a  that served with the United States Navy from 1945 to 1946. She was scrapped in 1966.

History
Fergus was named after a county in Montana. She was launched 24 December 1944 by Consolidated Steel at Wilmington, California; acquired by the Navy 19 February 1945; and commissioned 20 February 1945.

World War II and after
Fergus sailed from San Diego 19 April 1945 for Saipan, where she transferred Marines to another transport bound for Okinawa. At Guam she unloaded cargo and embarked hospital patients for San Francisco, returning 24 June. Her next voyage, between 1 July and 20 October, was devoted to redeployment of troops among Pacific bases and to occupation duty in Japan. Fergus made two cruises, one to Guam, Leyte, and Pearl Harbor, and the other to Pearl Harbor alone, to return servicemen eligible for discharge.

Decommissioning
She was decommissioned 25 June 1946 at Pearl Harbor, and towed to San Francisco Bay, where she was transferred to the Maritime Commission for disposal on 4 September 1947. She was scrapped 14 January 1966.

References

USS Fergus (APA-82), Navsource Online.

 

Gilliam-class attack transports
Transports of the United States Navy
World War II auxiliary ships of the United States
World War II amphibious warfare vessels of the United States
Fergus County, Montana
Ships built in Los Angeles
1944 ships